Chingford is a railway station located in Chingford in the London Borough of Waltham Forest, east London, operated by London Overground since 31 May 2015. It is one of three northern termini of the Lea Valley lines,  down the line from London Liverpool Street. The station is close to Queen Elizabeth's Hunting Lodge.

The station is in Travelcard Zone 5.

History 
The Eastern Counties Railway had begun its venture into a main line railway that would head north to compete with the Great Northern.  Limited funds and incessant squabbling had slowed its progress.
After the merger with several other lines, the ECR became part of the Great Eastern Railway. The GER planned a network of lines to serve countryside around London by its Metropolitan Station and Railways Act of 1864. It also planned a line to High Beach, to serve Epping Forest, which reached a terminus in Bull Lane (now Kings Road) at the very end of Hale End Road (now Larkshall Road) in Chingford, in 1873. In 1878 the small station (named 'Chingford Green') near to the village green was replaced by a much more grandiose station on the very edge of town, overlooking the forest.  The extension of the railway by only  to a place far less useful to the local population was an attempt to trap tourist traffic to the forest, and to stimulate suburban growth in the fields surrounding it. The line was doubled and the new station built as a through station, with its platforms and tracks leading out onto an embankment ready to leap across the newly named Station Road and enter the forest.

The railway fostered new interest in the forest as a destination and the popularity of this Crown land and its impending loss to development was not unnoticed.  In 1882 Queen Victoria came by train to Chingford and declared the forest open to the public forever.  The railway that had encouraged so much interest and carried the Royal party to the very edge of town was now stumped as any new development on the forest lands would be strictly controlled. However, the Chingford Rise Estate company developed land to the south with large villas, some of which now sell for over £1 million.

Chingford became a commuter terminal and was eventually truncated to make way for a bus station. The line no longer towers over the forest, but hides quietly behind the bustle of Station Road, its electric trains now transporting workers into the city rather than helping the masses to escape it.

The station building is relatively unchanged since its 1878 construction, and still carries the grandeur that accompanied the railway schemes of the late 19th century.

The line was electrified in the late 1950s by the Eastern Region of British Railways with electric services commencing on 21 November 1960. Early services were formed of Class 305 EMUs but initial technical problems with these saw replacements by Class 302 and Class 304 EMUs.

There is a plastic owl in the underside of the canopy over platform two, just outside the newsagent's, an attempt to stop pigeons landing there. Ticket barriers were installed in 2011.

Operation transferred from Abellio Greater Anglia to London Overground on 31 May 2015.

Connections
Chingford bus station is located adjacent to Chingford railway station. London Buses routes 97, 179, 212, 313, 379, 385, 397, 444 and night route N26 serve the station.

Services
The maximum length of trains to/from Chingford station is 8 carriages, though with Class 305 stock, it was 9.
Trains are operated by London Overground.

The typical off-peak weekday service pattern is:
4 trains per hour to London Liverpool Street.

Gallery

References

External links 

Railway stations in the London Borough of Waltham Forest
Former Great Eastern Railway stations
Railway stations in Great Britain opened in 1873
Railway station
Railway stations served by London Overground